Ciechanowski (feminine: Ciechanowska; plural: Ciechanowscy) is a Polish-language surname associated with  locations named Ciechanów in Poland, most probably the town of Ciechanów. The surname is Russified as Tsekhanovsky.

The surname may refer to:
Damian Ciechanowski (born 1996), Polish professional footballer 
, Polish official, chairman of the Office for War Veterans and Victims of Oppression
Waldemar Ciechanowski, a former singer from Polish rock band Quidam
Mikhail Tsekhanovsky (1889-1965), Soviet animated film director

Polish-language surnames